Kazakh sultanate  or Gazakh sultanate was established at the end of the 15th century. During the Safavid Empire, it was part of the Karabakh principality. In 1605, by the decree of Abbas the Great, Shamsaddin sultan of Kazakh was given the rank of Khan.

The rulers of the Kazakh sultanate also held the title of Sultan using monarchy as a form power. 3 clans held the power in the Kazakh sultanate in different period of time. The first rulers were from "Kazakhli" (or "Gazakhli") or "Algazakhli", later known as Shikhlinsky clan.

During the Ottoman period, a total of 256 villages came under the control of the Kazakh Sultanate, including 205 villages of the Kazakh Sanjag connected to the Tiflis province and 51 villages of the Ganja-Karabakh province.

In 1801, the Kazakh Sultanate was annexed to Russian Empire together with the Sultanates of Borchaly, Shamshadil and Shoragel. Later the Sultanate's territories became part of the administrative unit in the Russian Empire labeled as Kazakh Uyezd.

Sultans 

 Nazar khan
 Shamsaddin khan
 Miralbey
 Subhanverdi khan
 Panakh aga Salahly
 Ali aga Salahly
 Mustafa aga Arif

See also
Treaty of Gulistan
Treaty of Turkmenchay
South Caucasus
Western Azerbaijan
Shamshadil sultanate
Shoragel sultanate
Khanates of the Caucasus
Azerbaijan Democratic Republic

References

Sources 

 
 
 

Former countries
Modern history of Azerbaijan
17th century in Iran
18th century in Armenia
19th century in Armenia
18th century in Azerbaijan
19th century in Azerbaijan
Former countries in Western Asia
Russo-Persian Wars
Former populated places in Tavush Province
1747 establishments in Asia
Populated places in Tovuz District
Former countries in the Middle East